Rohit Khurana is an Indian television actor known for his work as Vansh Singh Bundela/Rocky in Uttaran and Shani in Karmaphal Daata Shani.

Personal life 
Khurana is married to his school friend Neha. They had a son and daughter.

Career

Modelling, acting debut and breakthrough (2001–13)

Khurana started his career as a model in Delhi. In TV, he had a small role in the serial Choti Maa: Ek Anokha Bandhan in 2001. In 2008 he obtained a lead role as Abhiram in the Telugu film Sangamam. However it failed to perform well commercially because of a lack of producers.

His  first major breakthrough and official debut occurred in TV with the dual role of Vansh Singh Bundela / Rocky in the Indian soap opera Uttaran on Colors TV in 2009 opposite Tina Datta. The show garnered him fame.

In 2010, Khurana featured in Star One's Miley Jab Hum Tum. He got selected next in Maayke Se Bandhi Dor on Star Plus in 2011. That year he debuted into Bollywood with Hindi movie Men Will Be Men. It failed to perform well commercially.

In 2012, Khurana was cast in the Tamil film Billa II. He forayed into Punjabi cinema with rom-com Dil Tainu Karda Ae Pyar.  In 2013, his 2nd Punjabi film named Singh vs Kaur was released.

Returning back to Hindi television, Khurana got the chance to enact the lead role in Sony Entertainment Television's love story Dil Ki Nazar Se Khoobsurat opposite Soumya Seth in 2013. He was praised for his performance as Madhav Periwal, an ugly man. He quit the series after his character's death.

Further works and success (2013–present)

Towards the end of 2013, Khurana entered Colors TV's popular daily soap Sasural Simar Ka. He was cast as an antagonist, Shaurya Singhania opposite Falaq Naaz. He exited the soap after playing for 3 months. Afterwards, he took a short break from acting.

Khurana ended his break in 2015 and came back to TV playing Jamaal Peshawari in Zee TV's Lajwanti. That year he gave an extended cameo appearance in Star Plus's Suhani Si Ek Ladki as Rohan, a lawyer. From 2015 to 2016, he essayed the part of Viraat in Big Magic's Chatur Aur Chalak, Birbal aur Viraat. He was chosen for the character of a garbage man in the Hindi short film Girl in Red.

The role of Dr. Manav Garewal in Colors TV's reincarnation based romance Kasam Tere Pyaar Ki marked Khurana's first television venture of 2017. Then he appeared in the film Hotel Beautifool. He received immense appreciation for his portrayal of adult Shani in Colors TV's mythological series Karmaphal Daata Shani which he bagged in the last quarter of 2017. He played the same role as a guest in Colors TV's another mythological show Mahakali — Anth Hi Aarambh Hai.

In 2019, Khurana was roped in for Colors TV's supernatural series Tantra essaying Daksh Mehra.

In 2020, he played as shani dev in Devi adi parashakti.

Filmography

Television

Films

Awards 
 2010 - New Talent Award for Best Supporting Actor — Uttaran.

References

External links 
 
 

Living people
Indian male film actors
Indian male television actors
Male actors in Hindi cinema
Indian male soap opera actors
Male actors from Delhi
21st-century Indian male actors
1983 births